Sphenomorphus papuae  is a species of skink found in Papua New Guinea.

References

papuae
Reptiles described in 1928
Taxa named by James Roy Kinghorn
Skinks of New Guinea